Marcoux is a village and commune in the Alpes-de-Haute-Provence department of southeastern France.

The closest airport to Marcoux is Nice Airport (91 km).

Geography
The river Bléone flows southwest through the northern part of the commune and forms part of its northeastern and western borders.

Population

Notable people 
 Jacques Chastan, French Roman Catholic missionary and martyr in Korea

See also
Communes of the Alpes-de-Haute-Provence department

References

Communes of Alpes-de-Haute-Provence
Alpes-de-Haute-Provence communes articles needing translation from French Wikipedia